Milnrow Road was a cricket ground in Rochdale, Lancashire. The first recorded match on the ground was in 1868, when the Gentlemen of Rochdale played Australian Aboriginals during their tour of England.

In 1876, the ground held its only first-class match when the North played the South.

The final recorded match on the ground came in 1877 when Rochdale played Burnley. The ground was later required for building and built over. The exact location of the ground is unknown, only that it was situated along Milnrow Road, which is still in existence to this day. A likely candidate for its location is an area of land halfway along the road which was called Park Fields.

References

External links
Milnrow Road on CricketArchive
Milnrow Road on Cricinfo

Defunct cricket grounds in England
Buildings and structures in Rochdale
Sport in Rochdale
Cricket grounds in Greater Manchester
Defunct sports venues in Greater Manchester
Sports venues completed in 1868